Fruitland, North Carolina may refer to the following places in North Carolina:
Fruitland, Henderson County, North Carolina, a census-designated place
Fruitland, Richmond County, North Carolina, an unincorporated community